Apagesoma is a genus of cusk-eel found in deep oceanic waters.

Species
There are currently three recognized species in this genus:
 Apagesoma australis J. G. Nielsen, N. J. King & Møller, 2008
 Apagesoma delosommatus (Hureau, Staiger & J. G. Nielsen, 1979)
 Apagesoma edentatum H. J. Carter, 1983

References

Ophidiidae
Marine fish genera